André Rougé is a French politician who was elected as a Member of the European Parliament in 2019.

References

Living people
MEPs for France 2019–2024
National Rally (France) MEPs
Year of birth missing (living people)